Jared Lawrence Hess (born July 18, 1979) and Jerusha Elizabeth Hess ( Demke; born May 12, 1980) are husband-and-wife American filmmakers best known for their work on Napoleon Dynamite (2004), Nacho Libre (2006) and Gentlemen Broncos (2009), all of which they co-wrote and which were directed by Jared (Nacho Libre was co-written with Mike White).

They also produced music videos for The Postal Service's third single, "We Will Become Silhouettes", and The Killers' Christmas charity single "Boots".

Personal life
Jerusha was born in Omaha, Nebraska, and Jared was born in Glendale, Arizona. Jared is a graduate of Burton Elementary School located in Kaysville, Utah, which he attended while living in Fruit Heights during his youth. He also attended Manhattan High School in Kansas for two years before transferring to Preston High School in Idaho, from which he graduated in 1997. Many scenes from Napoleon Dynamite were filmed there. As a teenager Jared worked in film production with T. C. Christensen.

Career
Jared met Jerusha while attending Brigham Young University's (BYU) film school. Together they co-wrote the film Napoleon Dynamite, which was produced and edited by their classmate Jeremy Coon.

While at BYU, Jared wrote and directed a student film entitled Cardboard Only, which is about a seven-year-old Idaho farm boy who struggles to escape boredom while wearing a cardboard box over his head. While at BYU, Jared also wrote and directed a short film entitled Peluca, which became a prototype for Napoleon Dynamite and featured much of the same cast and plotline, including Jon Heder as Seth, "super nerd extraordinaire."

Besides Napoleon Dynamite and Peluca, Jared has worked as a camera assistant in a number of films and has played minor roles in a few Latter-day Saint comedies. These include The Singles Ward, The R.M. and Pride and Prejudice: A Latter-day Comedy. Their second movie Nacho Libre, starring Jack Black, was released on June 16, 2006.

The third major film made by the Hesses, Gentlemen Broncos, was released in 2009. It is about a teenager who aspires to be a writer, but after attending a fantasy-writer's convention, he finds that his idea has been stolen by an established novelist. The film stars Michael Angarano as the teenager, Jemaine Clement as the established novelist, and Sam Rockwell as the story's fictional title character who appears in book-come-to-life sequences.

In 2010, Jared created ads for the Utah State Fair which were run on the radio, but refused on television. The Utah State Fair representatives claimed they refused to run them due to sexual overtones, while Hess claimed the failure to run the ads was because the main actor in them, Markus T. Boddie, was an African-American.

In 2011, Jerusha directed a film adaptation of the book Austenland, which was released in 2013. She also co-wrote the screenplay.

Jared and Jerusha Hess are also among the executive producers of the Napoleon Dynamite series that aired in 2012. In addition, Jared voiced Don Moser, a returning character originally portrayed by Trevor Snarr in the film.

Jared directed the comedy heist film Masterminds (2016).

Jared was among the executive producers for the Fox TV series Making History, which premiered in 2017.

In 2019, it was announced that Jared would direct an animated musical movie adaptation of Thelma the Unicorn for Netflix.

Jared co-directed (with Tyler Measom) a true crime docu-series Murder Among the Mormons, which premiered on Netflix on March 3, 2021.

In 2022, it was announced that Jared will direct the film adaptation of Minecraft for Warner Bros. Pictures, with Jason Momoa starring.

Filmography

Film

Television

References

External links
 
 
 PixelSurgeon interview with Jared Hess
 Fox Searchlight profile

Comedy film directors
Filmmaking duos
Living people
Married couples
Year of birth missing (living people)